WWWI may refer to:

 WWWI (AM), a radio station (1270 AM) licensed to Baxter, Minnesota, United States
 WWWI-FM, a radio station (95.9 FM) licensed to Pillager, Minnesota
 WWWI-Directory, a UK business directory
 WPTI, a radio station (94.5 FM) licensed to serve Eden, North Carolina, United States, which held the call sign WWWI from 1984 to 1986